"Circles" is a song by American rapper and singer Post Malone. It was released through Republic Records on August 30, 2019, as the third single from Malone's third studio album Hollywood's Bleeding (2019). It reached number one on the US Billboard Hot 100 for the week of November 30, 2019, topping the chart for three weeks, marking Post Malone's fourth number-one song, as well as his first solo effort to top the chart.
The song also reached number one in Iceland, Malaysia, and New Zealand, as well as the top ten in 20 additional countries. It was the most played song of 2020 on adult contemporary radio in the US. It is also certified ten times platinum in Australia, nine times platinum in Canada, nine times in the US, and Gold or higher in 11 additional countries. It was also nominated for Record of the Year and Song of the Year at the 2021 Grammy Awards.

Promotion
Post Malone premiered the song live during his Bud Light Dive Bar Tour show in New York City on August 5, where he claimed it would be released the following week. A snippet of the track was posted to Malone's YouTube channel the same day. He previewed the song in August 2019 on the Tonight Show Starring Jimmy Fallon.

Composition
"Circles" is a downtempo pop rock song consisting of a "bouncy, melancholy" melody, alongside a "gentle acoustic groove". The chorus has been described as "compulsory singalong". It is written in the key of C major, in common time, at a tempo of 120 beats per minute. It follows a chord structure of Cmaj7–Em/B–Fmaj7–Fm, followed by Cmaj7–Em/B–Fmaj7–G6.

Critical reception
The song received critical acclaim. Billboard described it as being "backed by sunny acoustic guitars, swirling percussion and infectious melodies", and that while it has a "funky feel, the meaning is a bit more somber, detailing a relationship gone cold".

R Dub, Z90.3 director of programming, told Billboard, "For me, the staying power of 'Circles' is due to a combination of an absolutely addicting, fun, emotional, and at the same time, non-fatiguing hook, combined with relatable lyrics. Who can't relate to going in circles in so many aspects of life? Young, old, rich, poor, black, white… We're all going through it".

The song's musical backing has been frequently compared to that of Tame Impala – so much so, that Tame Impala's Kevin Parker was originally believed to be one of the song's co-writers prior to the song's release.

Chart performance
On the chart dated November 30, 2019, "Circles" became Post Malone's fourth number one on the US Billboard Hot 100 and his first unaccompanied by another artist. It also marked his second Hot 100 number one of 2019, following "Sunflower" with Swae Lee, which led the chart in January. On the chart dated May 2, 2020, "Circles" broke the record for the most weeks spent in the Hot 100's top 10; 34 weeks  surpassing his own song, "Sunflower" (2019), Maroon 5 and Cardi B's "Girls Like You" (2018), and Ed Sheeran's "Shape of You" (2017), which all logged 33 weeks each in that region. It simultaneously passed the latter for the most weeks spent in the top 10 from a song's debut. It later extended its record to 39 weeks. "Circles" would keep the record for five more months before The Weeknd's "Blinding Lights" broke the record by reaching 40 weeks (and then 57 in total); it would later be surpassed again in 2021 by Dua Lipa's "Levitating," which spent a total of 41 weeks in the top 10. "Circles" spent 61 weeks on the chart before leaving in November 2020. It was also the most-played radio song of 2020.

Additionally, it became the first song to spend 30 weeks in the top 10 of Billboards Mainstream Top 40 radio airplay chart, where it also ranked at number one for 10 weeks, becoming the first single by a solo male artist (no features) to achieve double-digit frames at number one on that chart.

Elsewhere, the song also peaked at number one in Iceland, Malaysia and New Zealand, number two in Australia, Canada, Ireland, Norway, Singapore and Slovakia, number three in Czech Republic, Denmark, Lithuania, Slovenia and the UK, while reaching the top 10 in several other nations.

Lawsuit
Malone filed a lawsuit against songwriter Tyler Armes for "falsely claiming that he is a co-author of the musical composition contained in the 'Circles' track". He stated that although Armes was present when the track was recorded on August 8, 2018, he did not make contributions to the track. According to the complaint from Malone, he continued to work with songwriters Walsh, Gunesberk and Bell in subsequent sessions after August 8, while Armes wasn't present in either of those sessions.

Music video
The music video, directed by Colin Tilley, was released on September 3, 2019. As of March 2023, it has over 550 million views on YouTube. It represents a medieval-style metaphor of the main theme of the song, "running in circles" in a relationship, moving forward by inertia and failing to put an end to it, thus ending up getting hurt. Post Malone plays a knight in armor who has to rescue a princess locked up in a tower (but endowed with magical powers). The princess, seeing the future through a magic mirror, discovers that Post will be defeated by the guardians of the tower and burned alive, so she casts a spell that makes future Post go back in time, so that he can try again to save her. Present Post, before reuniting with his future self, has a hallucination in which he sees that same future and is then buried alive by zombies, however being awakened by the princess's spell. Once recovered, he goes to rescue her, this time succeeding. But the director's choice to show again, at the end of the video, Post staring during the hallucination at that tragic future which he then avoided, suggests that such a future could still happen later, perhaps having to go back in time again, and so on.

Personnel
Credits adapted from Tidal.

Musicians

Post Malone – vocals, programming, guitar
 Frank Dukes – programming
 Louis Bell – programming
 Kaan Gunesberk – guitar

Production

 Frank Dukes – production, songwriting
Louis Bell – production, vocal production, songwriting
Post Malone – production, songwriting
Billy Walsh – songwriting
 Kaan Gunesberk – songwriting
Technical
 Louis Bell – recording
Manny Marroquin – mixing
 Chris Galland – mixing assistant
 Robin Florent – mixing assistant
 Scott Desmarais – mixing assistant
 Jeremie Inhaber – mixing assistant
 Mike Bozzi – mastering

Charts

Weekly charts

Year-end charts

All-time charts

Certifications

Release history

Covers
Sheryl Crow covered the song in 2022, with it getting airplay on Pat Monahan's Train Tracks program on SiriusXM's The Pulse.

Of Monsters And Men covered the song in 2020 under Republic Records.

See also
 List of Billboard Hot 100 number-one singles of 2019
 List of Billboard Hot 100 number-one singles of 2020
 List of highest-certified singles in Australia
 List of number-one songs of 2019 (Malaysia)
 List of number-one singles from the 2010s (New Zealand)
 List of Billboard Adult Contemporary number ones of 2020

References

2019 singles
2018 songs
American pop rock songs
Billboard Hot 100 number-one singles
Number-one singles in Iceland
Number-one singles in Malaysia
Number-one singles in New Zealand
Post Malone songs
Republic Records singles
Song recordings produced by Frank Dukes
Song recordings produced by Louis Bell
Songs written by Frank Dukes
Songs written by Louis Bell
Songs written by Post Malone
American soft rock songs
Downtempo songs
Song recordings produced by Post Malone